The Colony is a 2007 Canadian short film, written, directed, edited, and composed by Jeff Barnaby. The film stars Glen Gould as Maytag, a Mi'kmaq man dealing with the emotional fallout of a love triangle, when his girlfriend Myriam (Kaniehtiio Horn) runs off with his friend and drug dealer Jackson (Kent McQuaid).

The film premiered at the 2007 Toronto International Film Festival. It was named to TIFF's annual year-end Canada's Top Ten list for 2007, and was a finalist for Best Aboriginal Film at the 2008 Yorkton Film Festival. It was a shortlisted Jutra Award nominee for Best Short Film at the 10th Jutra Awards in 2008.

References

External links
 

2007 films
Canadian drama short films
Films directed by Jeff Barnaby
EyeSteelFilm films
2000s Canadian films
Mi'kmaq-language films